Worsley is a hamlet in northern Alberta, Canada within Clear Hills County. It lies at an elevation of  amidst prairie farmland and ranchland.

It was named after Erick Worsley, a British Cavalry Officer and fur trader who arrived in the area in the 1930. Clear Hills County's municipal office is located in Worsley.

History 
The first post office was established in Worsley in 1931.

Demographics 
The population of Worsley according to the 2008 municipal census conducted by Clear Hills County is 28.

Economy 
Worsley is an agricultural service centre for the surrounding farming communities, which raise mostly crops of barley, wheat, canola and fescue.

Attractions 

See also 
List of communities in Alberta
List of hamlets in Alberta

References 

Clear Hills County
Hamlets in Alberta